The Kajibacha River is a river located in Batiaghata Upazila of Khulna District, Bangladesh.

Location
This river connects the Rupsha River with the Pasur River. The Kajibacha River divides Batiaghata Upazila into two parts.

References

Rivers of Bangladesh
Khulna District
Rivers of Khulna Division